The 2010 Cal Poly Mustangs football team represented California Polytechnic State University in the 2010 NCAA Division I FCS football season. The team's head coach was Tim Walsh. The Mustangs play their home games at Alex G. Spanos Stadium in San Luis Obispo, California. They finished the season 7–4, 2–2 in Great West Conference play.

Schedule

Game summaries

Fresno State outscored Cal Poly 17-0 in the second half in the first meeting between the two rivals since 1985. Bulldogs go to 8-0 vs. FCS/1-AA teams under Pat Hill.

See also
 2010 NCAA Division I FCS football rankings

References

Cal Poly
Cal Poly Mustangs football seasons
Cal Poly Mustangs football